Saphenista runtuna is a species of moth of the family Tortricidae. It is found in Tungurahua Province, Ecuador.

The ground colour of the forewings is whitish, with indistinct greyish-cream admixture. There are brownish-grey dots along the costa and dorsum. The suffusions are greyish brown. The hindwings are whitish, tinged with brownish at the apex.

Etymology
The species name refers to the type locality, Runtun in Baños Canton.

References

Saphenista
Moths described in 2009